Thiodia is a genus of moths belonging to the subfamily Olethreutinae of the family Tortricidae.

Species
Thiodia anatoliana Kennel, 1916
Thiodia caradjana Kennel, 1916
Thiodia citrana (Hübner, [1796-1799])
Thiodia confusana Kuznetzov, 1973
Thiodia couleruana (Duponchel, in Godart, 1835)
Thiodia dahurica (Falkovitsh, 1965)
Thiodia densistriata (Falkovitsh, 1964)
Thiodia elbursica Kuznetzov, 1973
Thiodia excavana Aarvik, 2004
Thiodia fessana (Mann, 1873)
Thiodia glandulosana Walsingham, 1907
Thiodia hyrcana Kuznetzov, 1976
Thiodia irinae Budashkin, 1990
Thiodia lerneana (Treitschke, 1835)
Thiodia major (Rebel, 1903)
Thiodia placidana (Staudinger, 1871)
Thiodia sulphurana (Christoph, 1888)
Thiodia torridana (Lederer, 1859)
Thiodia trochillana (Frolich, 1828)
Thiodia tscheliana (Caradja, 1927)

See also
List of Tortricidae genera

References

External links
tortricidae.com

Eucosmini
Tortricidae genera
Taxa named by Jacob Hübner